The .22 TCM or 22TCM (.22 Tuason Craig Micromagnum) is a proprietary bottle-necked cartridge created from a 5.56 NATO cartridge developed by custom gunsmith Fred Craig and Rock Island Armory (RIA) for semi-automatic pistols and the Rock Island M22 TCM bolt-action rifle. Before the cartridge was commercialized, it was called the 22 Micro-Mag. Similar conceptually to other bottle-necked pistol cartridges such as the larger-caliber .357 SIG, the .22 TCM trades bullet mass for increased velocity and lowered recoil.

Based on the 5.56×45mm NATO case and shortened so that the shoulder is at approximately the same length as a .38 Super cartridge, the .22 TCM is somewhat longer than the ubiquitous 9×19mm Parabellum and designed to be fired from a RIA line of firearms (which also included 9mm barrel swaps) fed by Para-Ordnance-style double-column .38 Super magazines. A sub-variant, the 22 TCM 9R, with a shorter, more deeply-seated bullet, is designed for use in Glock magazines limited to standard-length 9mm cartridges. Standard factory loads are 40-grain jacketed soft hollow point, 39-grain for "9R".

See also
 .22 Spitfire
 .221 Remington Fireball, a similar necked .22 centerfire round
 .224 Boz
 5mm RRM (5.2x26mm)
 7.62×25mm Tokarev
 7.63×25mm Mauser
 7.65×21mm Parabellum
 7.65×25mm Borchardt
 FN 5.7×28mm

References

External links

Pistol and rifle cartridges
Paramilitary cartridges